Out of the Cradle: Exploring the Frontiers beyond Earth is a 1984 book written and illustrated by planetary scientist William K. Hartmann, Ron Miller and Pamela Lee. Cradle describes potential crewed space missions to the planets, moons and asteroids of the Solar System. The approximately 100 space art illustrations were in large part based on photographs from the uncrewed space probes Pioneer 11, Voyager 1, and the Viking Lander, available at the time of publication, with scientific extrapolation of the likely appearance of various planetary surfaces. The title is derived from a quote from Konstantin Tsiolkovsky, included in the preface: "Earth is the cradle of humanity, but one cannot live in the cradle forever."

The book is notable for introducing (on p. 182) Hartmann's 'golden rule' of space exploration: 

Space exploration must be carried out in a way so as to reduce, not aggravate, tensions in human society.

Contents
Preface by William K. Hartmann
Prologue: The Solar System as Our Backyard
The Beginning
Alternatives: A Future Without Space?
From Shuttles to Space Cities
Robot Astronauts
Return to the Moon
Asteroids and Comets: Our First Landfalls Beyond the Moon
Martians - In Myth and Reality
Phobos and Deimos: Depots on the Road to Mars
Into the Realm of Ice and Fire
The Search for Life
Epilogue: The Golden Rule of Space Explorations

Reception
Cradle has received positive critical academic reviews, including from the Journal of the Royal Astronomical Society of Canada. It has been recommended as a teaching aid for science classes.

References

Out of the Cradle: Exploring the Frontiers beyond Earth, William K. Hartmann, Ron Miller and Pamela Lee. New York: Workman Publishing (1984)

External links
Out of the Cradle at WorldCat

American non-fiction books
Popular science books
1984 non-fiction books
Spaceflight books
Workman Publishing Company books